William Leveson-Gower may refer to:

Sir William Leveson-Gower, 4th Baronet (c. 1647–1691)
William Leveson-Gower (died 1756) (c. 1696–1756), British Tory politician, MP for Staffordshire 1720–1756
William Leveson-Gower, 4th Earl Granville (1880–1953)

See also
William Gower, MP